Şəkərabad (also, Shakyarabad, Shekerabad, and Shekyarabad) is a village and municipality in the Babek District of Nakhchivan, Azerbaijan. It is located 4 km in the north from the district center, on the left bank of the Nakhchivanchay River. Its population is busy with grain-growing, vegetable-growing and animal husbandry. There are secondary school, club, library, mosque and a medical center in the village. It has a population of 985.

Etymology
According to the information of the 1886, the village was consisted from the 25 houses. The settlement has been established by the person named Sheker. The name of the village of the Shekerabad means "a village which belongs to Sheker".

Notable natives 

 Islam Safarli — writer, Honored Art Worker of Azerbaijan SSR (1973).

References 

Populated places in Babek District